Nuyts Archipelago is an island group in South Australia

Nuyts Archipelago  may also refer:

Nuyts Archipelago Conservation Park, a protected area in South Australia
Nuyts Archipelago Important Bird Area, a designation associated with the Nuyts Archipelago
Nuyts Archipelago Marine Park, a marine protected area associated with the Nuyts Archipelago
Nuyts Archipelago Wilderness Protection Area, a protected area in South Australia

See also
Nuyts (disambiguation)